The 1976 Pan Arab Games football tournament was the 5th edition of the Pan Arab Games men's football tournament. The football tournament was held in Damascus, Syria between 7–21 October 1976 as part of the 1976 Pan Arab Games.

Participating teams
The following countries have participated for the final tournament:

Squads

Final tournament

Tournament classification

Matches

External links
5th Pan Arab Games, 1976 (Damascus, Syria) - rsssf.com

1976 Pan Arab Games
1976
Pan
Pan
1976